Rhytida australis  is a species of small, air-breathing land snail, a terrestrial pulmonate gastropod mollusc in the family Rhytididae.

Distribution
This species is endemic to Stewart Island in New Zealand.

Life cycle 
The dimensions of the eggs of Rhytida australis are 2.75 × 2.25, 2.75 × 2, 2.75 × 2.25 mm.

References

Rhytida
Taxa named by Frederick Hutton (scientist)
Gastropods described in 1883
Gastropods of New Zealand
Endemic fauna of New Zealand
Endemic molluscs of New Zealand